Rostyslav Shurma (born 17 September 1983) is a Ukrainian statesman, as well as the Deputy Head of the Office of the President of Ukraine. He was the CEO of the Zaporizhstal plant from 2012 to 2019.

Early life 

Rostyslav Shurma was born on 17 September 1983 in Lviv.

In 2004, he graduated from the National University of Kyiv-Mohyla Academy, majoring in “Economics and entrepreneurship”, bachelor's degree. 

In 2005, he graduated from the Kyiv National Economic University, majoring in “Economic theory”, master's degree.

Career 

In 2003—2005, he worked as a financial manager at Procter & Gamble in Eastern Europe.

Since 2006, Rostyslav Shurma worked in the Metinvest group. He also headed the strategy department, worked as the financial director of Makiivka Iron and Steel Plant, deputy director of the metallurgical division of Metinvest. 

He was a member of the supervisory board of the Mariupol Metallurgical Plant, the chairman of the supervisory board of the Promet Plant in Bulgaria, a member of the board of directors of Metinvest-Trametal in Italy.

From 30 July 2012 to 25 November 2019, he was the CEO of Zaporizhstal.

On 21 May 2021, he was appointed a member of the Supervisory Board of Ukroboronprom.

Since March 2021 he worked as an Advisor to the Office of the President of Ukraine (out of staff).

Since 23 November 2021, he is the Deputy Head of the Office of the President of Ukraine.

References 

Living people
1983 births
Businesspeople from Lviv
Kyiv National Economic University alumni
National University of Kyiv-Mohyla Academy alumni
Politicians from Lviv